Biththi Hathara is a 1982 Sri Lankan drama film directed by Parakrama de Silva and produced by H.D. Premasiri for Sarasavi Cineroo. The film was based on the book of the same name written by Sugathapala de Silva. It stars Neil Alles, Swarna Mallawarachchi and Vasanthi Chathurani in lead roles along with Menik Kurukulasuriya and Nadeeka Gunasekara. Music composed by Justin Abeywardena. It is the 536th Sri Lankan film in the Sinhala cinema.

Cast
 Neil Alles as Sepala
 Swarna Mallawarachchi as Samadara
 Vasanthi Chathurani as Mallika
 Menik Kurukulasuriya as Chandani 
 Nadeeka Gunasekara as Nandani
 Piyasena Ahangama as Jayasena
 Swarnamali Danthure Bandara as Suneetha
 Devika Mihirani
 Ruby de Mel
 Rathnawali Kekunawela
 Nissanka Diddeniya
 Prasanna Fonseka
 Savithri Weerasiri
 Gamini Wijesuriya

Songs

References

External links
 

1982 films
1980s Sinhala-language films
1982 drama films
Sri Lankan drama films